Danger—Human is a collection of science fiction stories by Gordon R. Dickson.  It was first published by Doubleday in 1970.  It was subsequently published by DAW Books, in 1973, as The Book of Gordon Dickson.  The stories originally appeared in the magazines Astounding, Analog Science Fiction and Fact, If, Galaxy Science Fiction and Fantasy and Science Fiction.

Contents

 "Danger—Human!"
 "Dolphin's Way"
 "And Then There Was Peace"
 "The Man from Earth"
 "Black Charlie"
 "Zeepsday"
 "Lulungomeena"
 "An Honorable Death"
 "Flat Tiger"
 "James"
 "The Quarry"
 "Call Him Lord"
 "Steel Brother"

References

Contento, William G. Index to Science Fiction Anthologies and Collections. Retrieved on 2008-01-16.

1970 short story collections
Short story collections by Gordon R. Dickson
Doubleday (publisher) books